Andrey Yepifanovich Ilyin (born July 18, 1960, Gorky, RSFSR, USSR) is a Soviet and Russian film and theater actor. Honored Artist of the Russian Federation (1993). He was awarded the Order of Friendship (2011). A member of the public organization  Union of Cinematographers of the Russian Federation.

The actor received wide recognition after he played the role of Chistyakov, husband of Anastasia Kamenskaya (Elena Yakovleva), the title character of the series Kamenskaya.

Personal life
 His first wife (1983–1992) was Lyudmila Voroshilova, assistant professor of acting at the Boris Shchukin Theatre Institute.
 Unregistered relations (1992-2000) with Aleksandra Tabakova, a Soviet and Russian actress, daughter of Oleg Tabakov.
 Second wife was Olga, swimming coach.
 Unregistered marriage (since 2010) with Inga Rutkiewicz, editor on television. Son   Tikhon  (born 2013).

Selected filmography
 1992 Encore, Once More Encore! as sergeant
 1995 What a Wonderful Game as Feliks Rayevsky
 2004 Moscow Saga (TV) as Savva Kitaygorodsky
 2005 Adjutants of Love (TV) as Roman Mongo-Stolypin, prince
 2006 Filipp's Bay (TV) as Ivin
 2006 Moscow Mission as Grishin
 2014 Vasilisa as Yelagin
 2021 The Pilot. A Battle for Survival as Misha 's dad
 2022 Zemun

References

External links
 
 Official Site // ailyin.ru
 Andrey Ilyin // Ruskino.ru

1960 births
Russian male actors
Soviet male actors
Honored Artists of the Russian Federation
Actors from Nizhny Novgorod
Living people